Walter Sullivan was an Australian actor, journalist and reviewer who worked extensively in radio, film, TV and theatre, over a career spanning  6 decades, he's stage and screen career spanning  from 1948 and 1997

Select Credits
The Slaughter of St Teresa's Day (1960)
Venus Observed (1960)
Stormy Petrel (1960)
Ballad for One Gun (1963)
A Dead Secret (1963)
Scobie Malone (1975)
Cop Shop
The Prisoner of Zenda (1988, voice)

References

External links
Walter Sullivan at IMDb
Walter Sullivan at Ausstage

Australian male actors